A vehicle fire is an undesired conflagration (uncontrolled burning) involving a motor vehicle. Also termed car fire, it is one of the most common causes of fire-related property damage.

Causes

Accidental
A motor vehicle contains many types of flammable materials, including flammable liquids like gasoline and oil as well as solid combustibles such as hose. Fuel leaks from ruptured fuel lines also can rapidly ignite, especially in petrol fuelled cars where sparks are possible in the engine compartment. Fires with casualties have been caused by ozone cracking of nitrile rubber fuel lines for example.

Vehicles house multiple potential sources of ignition including electrical devices that may short circuit, hot exhaust systems, and modern car devices such as air bag detonators.

It is often the case in accidental auto fires that the bulk of the fire is (at least initially) contained in the engine compartment of the vehicle. In most vehicles, the passenger compartment is protected from engine compartment fire by a firewall. However, in case of arson, the fire does not always start in the interior or spread there. It is mandatory to carry an in-car fire extinguisher in some countries, such as Belgium, Bulgaria and Poland.

From 2003 to 2007 in the United States, there were 280,000 car fires per year, which caused 480 deaths.

Arson

In the UK, accidental car fires are declining but deliberate car fires (arson) are increasing. There are approximately the same number of deliberate car fires as there are accidental car fires in the UK. It is common for joyriders to set fire to stolen cars: abandoned cars are commonly set on fire by vandals. Around two cars out of every thousand registered in the UK catch fire each year.

In France, widespread arson of cars is regularly committed by youths during New Year's Eve celebrations. This began during the 1990's in poorer areas of Strasbourg, but has since spread nation-wide.

In Sweden, a pattern has emerged in recent years of cars being set on fire by youths in the summer, towards the end of the school summer holidays.

History
While some cases of deliberate car fires are isolated incidents, committed clandestinely, the practice is publicly performed by either rioters and revelers, with little to no retribution. Some tragic vehicle fires have received wide publicity, some evidently due to accident or mechanical or electrical problems, and other due to crimes.

See also
Ford Pinto
Forensic engineering
Plug-in electric vehicle fire incidents
Vauxhall Zafira

References

External links

Automotive safety
Types of fire
Fire